The Lady with the Mask is a 1928 German silent film directed by Wilhelm Thiele and starring Max Gülstorff, Arlette Marchal and Vladimir Gajdarov. It was shot at the Babelsberg Studios in Berlin. The film's sets were designed by the art director Erich Czerwonski.

Cast
 Max Gülstorff as Freiherr von Seefeld
 Arlette Marchal as Doris von Seefeld - seine Tochter
 Vladimir Gajdarov as Alexander von Illagin
 Heinrich George as Otto Hanke, ein Holzhändler
 Dita Parlo as Kitty
 Paul Hörbiger as Michael - ein russischer Bauernknecht
 Gyula Szőreghy as Direktor des Apollo Theaters
 Harry Lamberts-Paulsen as Der Regisseur
 Fritz Kampers as Der Inspizient
 Gertrud Eysoldt as Eine Garderobenfrau
 Hilde Elsner as Revue-Girl
 William Huch

References

Bibliography
 Hans-Michael Bock and Tim Bergfelder. The Concise Cinegraph: An Encyclopedia of German Cinema. Berghahn Books.

External links

1928 films
Films of the Weimar Republic
German silent feature films
Films directed by Wilhelm Thiele
UFA GmbH films
German black-and-white films
1920s German films
Films shot at Babelsberg Studios